Blue Angel is a novel written by author Francine Prose that was published in the year 2000. The novel is about the complex relationship between Ted – a 47 years old English professor – and his student Angela that evolves as a satire on sexual harassment on college campuses. This was Prose's 10th publication. The novel is part of the National Library of Australia.

Reception 
Boston Review wrote about the book, "One problem with message-driven theater or literature—presumably, Prose's message is that legislating matters of the heart sets a dangerous precedent in terms of privacy and freedom—is that it quickly dates itself."

Kirkus Reviews said, "An academic comedy of manners as engaging as Richard Russo's Straight Man: Prose once again proves herself one of our great cultural satirists."

References 

2000 American novels
American satirical novels
Political satire novels